Edward James (1907–1984) was a British poet and art patron.

Edward James may also refer to:
Edward James (barrister) (1807–1867), English barrister
Edward James (priest) (1569–1610?), Welsh priest and translator
Edward James (historian) (born 1947), Professor of medieval history at University College Dublin
Edward James (judge) (1757–1841), judge and politician in Nova Scotia
Edward James (martyr) (c. 1557–1588), English Catholic priest and martyr
Edward James (Nova Scotia politician) (1825–1909), politician in Nova Scotia, Canada
Edward Holton James (1873–1954), American socialist
Ed James (disc jockey) (born 1976), British radio DJ
Ed James (writer) (1908–1995), American writer and creator of the U.S. sitcom Father Knows Best
Eddie James (born 1961), American murderer

Sports
Eddie James (Canadian football) (1907–1958), Canadian football running back
Eddy James (1874–1937), Australian rules footballer
Edward James (cricketer) (1896–1975), Welsh cricketer

See also
Ted James (disambiguation)